Günter Wewel (born 29 November 1934) is a German operatic bass and television presenter. Based at the Opernhaus Dortmund for decades, he performed 80 roles in Germany and Europe. He is known for presenting the television series Kein schöner Land, with more than 150 episodes, which portrays regions in Europe, their landscape, people and folklore, and was filmed at the locations.

Life 

Wewel was born in Arnsberg. After school, he first trained as a civil servant with the Deutsche Bundesbahn. He then studied voice, especially opera, at the Dortmund Conservatory. He studied further with Rudolf Watzke in Dortmund and Johannes Kobeck in Vienna.

Wewel was a member of the Dortmund Opera from 1963, with Generalmusikdirektor Wilhelm Schüchter, and remained at the house throughout his career. From 1965, he appeared as a guest in Germany at the Bavarian State Opera, the Hamburg State Opera, the Staatstheater Stuttgart, the Deutsche Oper am Rhein, the Cologne Opera and  Staatstheater Hannover, among others. Internationally, he performed at the Budapest National Opera, in Paris, Strasbourg, Bordeaux, Rouen, Salzburg and the Opernhaus Zürich.

He performed over 80 roles, including Osmin in Mozart's Die Entführung aus dem Serail, the Komtur in Don Giovanni, Sarastro in Die Zauberflöte, Rocco in Beethoven's Fidelio", Philipp II in Verdi's Don Carlo, Gremin in Tchaikovsky's Eugen Onegin, Daland in Wagner's Der fliegende Holländer, Heinrich in Lohengrin, Marke in Tristan und Isolde and Titurel in Parsifal. He also performed in operettas. In the mid-1980s, he performed as Landgrave Hermann in a complete recording of Wagner's Tannhäuser from the Theater Saarbrücken. In 1989, he was awarded the title Kammersänger.

From 1989 to 2007, Wewel was the presenter of the musical entertainment television program Kein schöner Land. The  series ran at irregular intervals, with more than 150 episodes in total, and was produced by Saarländischer Rundfunk. Wewel took his guests to different regions of Europe and presented people, landscapes and customs. The musical part of the program ranged from folklore typical for the region to hits, folk music and light classical music, to which Wewel often contributed songs. It was the first music program on television filmed at the original locations and not in the studio.

In addition to his opera work, he also recorded numerous Volkslieder. He was married to Gisela Wewel from 1959; she died on 20 September 2014 at the age of 76.

Honours 
 1989: Kammersänger
 1992: Order of Merit of the Federal Republic of Germany.
 1992: Hermann-Löns-Medaille in Gold.
 1996: Order of Merit of North Rhine-Westphalia.
 1999: Goldene Europa.
 1999: Ring of honour of his hometown Arnsberg.

Hits 
Source:
 1979: "Ihr mögt den Rhein" (Westfalenlied)
 1987: "Alle Tage ist kein Sonntag"
 1987: "Müde kehrt ein Wandersmann zurück"
 1992: "Die wilde Jagd"
 1994: ""
 1998: "Auf auf, zum fröhlichen Jagen"

Albums  
 1980: Wo man Bier trinkt – Songs for cheerful drinking culture
 1982: Gasparone
 1989: Ein russisches Märchen – Die schönsten russischen Volkslieder
 1994: Kein schöner Land
 1998: Jagd- und Waldlieder
 Wer die Heimat liebt – Die schönsten Heimatlieder Deutschlands

References

External links 
 
 
 
 

German operatic basses
German television presenters
Recipients of the Cross of the Order of Merit of the Federal Republic of Germany
Members of the Order of Merit of North Rhine-Westphalia
1934 births
Living people
People from Arnsberg